The 2022 Men's Hockey Asia Cup was the eleventh edition of the Men's Hockey Asia Cup, the quadrennial international men's field hockey championship of Asia organised by the Asian Hockey Federation. On 15 March 2022 it was announced the tournament would be held at the GBK Hockey Field in Jakarta, Indonesia from 23 May to 1 June 2022.

India were the defending champions. South Korea won their fifth title after a finals win over Malaysia. The top three teams not already qualified qualified for the 2023 Men's FIH Hockey World Cup.

Qualification
The top five teams from the previous Asia Cup, the hosts and the two finalists from the 2022 AHF Cup qualified for the tournament.

Qualified teams

Results
All times are local (UTC+7).

Preliminary round

Pool A

Pool B

Fifth to eighth place classification

Fifth to eighth place crossovers

Seventh place game

Fifth place game

Second round

First to fourth place classification

Third place game

Final

Statistics

Final standings

 Qualified for the 2023 World Cup
 Qualified for the 2023 World Cup as host

Goalscorers

See also
 2022 Women's Hockey Asia Cup
 2022 Men's Indoor Hockey Asia Cup

References

Hockey Asia Cup
Asia Cup
Hockey Asia Cup
Hockey Asia Cup
AHF Cup
Sports competitions in Jakarta
2020s in Jakarta
International field hockey competitions hosted by Indonesia
Asia Cup